San Cristóbal Amatlán is a town and municipality in Oaxaca in south-western Mexico. The municipality covers an area of 96.96 km². 
It is part of the Miahuatlán District in the south of the Sierra Sur Region.

As of 2005, the municipality had a total population of 3978.

Amatlán Zapotec is spoken in the town; many residents are bilingual in Spanish. The town is located "at the foot of a very tall mountain" called  Yiroos in Zapotec.

References

External links 
Photos of San Cristobal Amatlán

Municipalities of Oaxaca